HMIS Punjab (J239) was a  which served in the Royal Indian Navy (RIN) during World War II.

History
HMIS Punjab was ordered in 1941, and built by Mort's Dock. She was commissioned in 1942, into the Eastern Fleet. She escorted a number of convoys until the end of the war.

In July 1945, in support of the planned Allied amphibious landings in Malaya, Punjab with other RIN and Royal Navy vessels conducted minesweeping operations off Phuket.

After the independence of India and the subsequent partition, she was among the vessels transferred to Pakistan.

Notes

Bathurst-class corvettes of the Royal Indian Navy
Minesweepers of the Pakistan Navy
1941 ships